Playfair may refer to:

 Playfair (surname)
 Playfair (lunar crater)
 Playfair (Martian crater)
 PlayFair, software that removes Apple's FairPlay DRM file encryption, now succeeded by Hymn

See also
Playfair Project
TS Playfair, a Canadian sail training vessel
Playfair's axiom named after John Playfair
Playfair cipher, a manual encryption technique invented in 1854 by Charles Wheatstone
Playfair Cricket Annual
Playfair Race Course
Lyon Playfair Library, now known as the Central Library, at Imperial College London